Alexander Joseph Killorn (born September 14, 1989) is a Canadian professional ice hockey centre and alternate captain for the Tampa Bay Lightning of the National Hockey League (NHL). He was selected by the Lightning in the third round, 77th overall, of the 2007 NHL Entry Draft. Killorn won back-to-back Stanley Cups with the Lightning in 2020 and 2021.

Although born in Halifax, Nova Scotia, he grew up in Beaconsfield, Quebec; his sisters are Katie and Rachel. He attended Loyola High School in Montreal and played Lakeshore minor hockey. He played midget AAA hockey for the Lac St. Louis Lions before attending Deerfield Academy in Deerfield, Massachusetts, from which he graduated in 2008.

Playing career

Collegiate
Killorn was selected by the Tampa Bay Lightning in the 2007 NHL Entry Draft in the third round, 77th overall, during the summer before his senior year at Deerfield. He then played collegiate hockey in the United States with Harvard University in the NCAA Men's Division I ECAC Hockey conference. In his senior year, Killorn's outstanding play was recognized when he was selected to the 2011–12 ECAC Hockey First Team.

Professional

On May 19, 2012, Killorn signed a two-year, entry-level contract with the Tampa Bay Lightning after completing his playing career with the Harvard Crimson men's ice hockey team.

On February 10, 2013, he recorded his first career NHL assist on a goal scored by Vincent Lecavalier, against the New York Rangers. One week later, on February 17, 2013, Killorn scored his first goal against the Florida Panthers.

On June 19, 2014, the Lightning announced that they had re-signed Killorn to a two-year contract extension.

During the 2015 Stanley Cup playoffs Killorn had a successful post season run with the Tampa Bay Lightning, helping them reach the Stanley Cup Final against the Chicago Blackhawks. The Lightning ended up falling to the Blackhawks in six games. Despite the loss, Killorn had a strong post season for the team, and also posted several records for former players from Harvard. Killorn's game one goal was the first goal scored by a Harvard alum in a Stanley Cup final. Killorn added a second goal in game five to become the first alum with multiple goals or assists in the final. His 2015 postseason scoring totals (9 goals, 9 assists, 18 points) are all single-post season records among the twelve Harvard alumni who have played in the NHL postseason. Killorn's 10 goals over two post seasons is second only to Dominic Moore (11 goals) on the Harvard all-time list, which was achieved in only 30 playoff games to Moore's 88.

On October 12, 2015, Killorn recorded his 100th career NHL point in a 6-3 Lightning win over the Boston Bruins. On October 27, 2015, Killorn skated in his 200th career NHL game in a 0-2 Lightning loss to the St. Louis Blues.

On July 17, 2016, Killorn signed a seven-year, $31 million extension with the Lightning. Last season Killorn appeared in 81 games with the team, recording 14 goals and 40 points. Killorn also skated in 17 Stanley Cup Playoff games last year, where he scored five goals and 13 points. Killorn has spent his entire NHL career with the Lightning, scoring 53 goals and 138 points. Killorn's biggest impact has come during the playoffs, where he has recorded 33 points in 47 games.

On November 3, 2017, the NHL Department of Player Safety fined Killorn $5,000 for an incident that occurred during a game against the New York Rangers the previous night at Amalie Arena. On February 19, 2019, Killorn recorded his 100th career NHL goal in a 5-2 Lightning victory over the Philadelphia Flyers at Wells Fargo Center. Killorn recorded his first career NHL hat-trick against the Washington Capitals on March 16, 2019. On September 10, 2020, Killorn was suspended by the NHL Department of Player Safety for boarding Brock Nelson during the Eastern Conference final playoff game against the New York Islanders on September 9, 2020, at Rogers Place.

On February 20, 2021, Killorn skated in his 600th career NHL game. Killorn became the sixth Lightning player in franchise history to skate in 600 games with the team.

International play

On April 19, 2017, Killorn was named to Canada's men's national ice hockey team for the 2017 IIHF World Championship. On May 21, 2017, Killorn earned a silver medal with Team Canada when they were defeated by Team Sweden 2–1.

Career statistics

Regular season and playoffs

International

Awards and honours

References

External links

1989 births
Living people
Anglophone Quebec people
Canadian expatriate ice hockey players in the United States
Canadian ice hockey centres
Deerfield Academy alumni
Harvard Crimson men's ice hockey players
Ice hockey people from Nova Scotia
Ice hockey people from Quebec
Norfolk Admirals players
People from Beaconsfield, Quebec
Quebec Amateur Athletic Association players
Sportspeople from Halifax, Nova Scotia
Stanley Cup champions
Syracuse Crunch players
Tampa Bay Lightning draft picks
Tampa Bay Lightning players
AHCA Division I men's ice hockey All-Americans